Raffaele Francesco Zich (born 23 June 2006) is an Italian figure skater. He is the 2022 JGP Poland I bronze medalist and 2022 European Youth Olympic silver medalist. He placed 15th at the 2022 World Junior Championships.

Personal life 
Zich was born 23 June 2006 in Hanoi, Vietnam, and resides in Turin, Italy. His grandfather, is the former rector of the Polytechnic University of Turin.

Career

Early years 
Zich began learning to skate in 2009. He became interested in the sport after accompanying his sister, Eleonora, to the ice rink. He competed for two seasons in the advanced novice category, winning the Italian novice men's title in March 2018.

His junior international debut came in October 2019 at the 2019–20 ISU Junior Grand Prix event in Egna, Italy.

The COVID-19 pandemic led to the cancellation of many international events in the 2020–21 season. In April 2021, Zich won the Italian junior national title.

2021–22 season 
Zich competed in both the junior and senior ranks, making his senior international debut in October at the Trophée Métropole Nice Côte d'Azur. He finished fourth in the senior category in December at the Italian Championships.

He was assigned to the 2022 World Junior Championships, which took place in April in Tallinn, Estonia. He was ranked 15th in the short and 13th in the free skate and finished 15th overall.

2022–23 season 
In October, Zich competed at consecutive 2022–23 ISU Junior Grand Prix events in Gdańsk, Poland. He won bronze at his first assignment and placed 13th the following week.

Programs

Competitive highlights 
GP: Grand Prix; CS: Challenger Series; JGP: Junior Grand Prix

References

External links 
 
 

2006 births
Italian male single skaters
Italian people of Vietnamese descent
Living people
Sportspeople from Hanoi
Sportspeople from Turin